Mazda's first automobile engine was the V-twin family. This tiny air-cooled engine was only produced for a few years in the early 1960s before Mazda introduced a more common inline-four engine configuration.

BA (356 cc)
The first automobile engine from Mazda was the 356 cc (60x63 mm) air-cooled 90° V-twin. It was an overhead valve 4-valve pushrod design. This engine produced  and 16 lb·ft (22 Nm) in the 1960 Mazda R360.

EB (577 cc)
The engine was enlarged to 577 cc for the 1961 B600, which was built until 1966. This engine is popular with custom motorcycle builders in Indonesia, who use it in a variety of frames to emulate the V-twin engined Harley-Davidsons.

References

See also
 Mazda engines

V-twin